'Harshida Madhaparia', is a UK-born singer and actress, currently based in Mumbai.
 
Harshi Mad is a singer and performer in Hindi, English, Gujarati, Punjabi. She performs in multiple genres including IndiPop, Hip Hop, Bollywood, Bhangra, Garba, and Classical.

She won many awards including the Indian Idol in the UK, and reached the finals of Indian Idol 3 in India. She’d also reached the finals of Sa Re Ga Ma Pa.

She was also one of the judges for the finals of a singing competition called "Sur Gujarat Ke" along with Altaf Raja and Dr. Krupesh Thacker at Gandhidham,Gujarat. The auditions were held in Mundra, Mandavi, Bhuj, Anjar and Gandhidham.She recently launched her first single "Holiday Madness".

Early life and background 
Harshi Mad was born on 6 May 1987 in London and has been based in Mumbai since 2007. She has two brothers and is the youngest of her siblings. She had been a dance instructor at a Cultural Arts School at a young age. She got inspired to sing after her older brother, Paresh Madhaparia, reached the finals of Sa Re Ga Ma 2005 representing UK. Her other brother, Nitin Madhaparia is a broadcast anchor. She took training from Kuldeep Singh for Indian classical music and has been trained at Anupam Kher's Actor Prepares for her acting skills. She also featured in the movie "Holiday”.

Awards and screen presence 
 Winner of the UK's Indian Idol. 
 Judged Finale of "Sur Gujarat ke" singing competition across Gujarat at Gandhidham
 Finalist of Indian Idol 3 amongst millions of contestants from India, UK and UAE.
 Finalist of Sa Re Ga Ma UK – picked by Himesh Reshammiya. 
 Hosted UK's auditions for Indian Idol 4.  
 Featured on Sony TV’s Neutrogena Lift Karade with Salman Khan and Karan Johar.
 VJ on Sony TV in UK.
 Top 2 Boogie Woogie –selected by Naved and Javed Jaffrey.
 Recorded vocals, jingles and written lyrics for top music directors such as: Rajesh Roshan, Aadesh Shrivastav, Anand Raj Anand, Monty Sharma, Sandesh Sandaliya, Sachin & Jigar.
 Performed in UK with many artists such as Dannii Minogue, Raghav, Malkit Singh, Jazzy B, Juggy D, Jay Sean. 
 Toured around the world with artists like Sunidhi Chauhan, Adnan Sami, Mika Singh, Sukhwinder Singh, Shreya Ghoshal, Kunal Ganjawala and Sonu Nigam.

Filmography 

 Tum Bin 2 – Featuring as lead female vocalist and performing in the film song "Jager Bomb"  Harshi Mad Ankit Tiwari Dwayne Bravo Neha Sharma Aditya Seal Aashim Gulati 
 Love Day: Pyaar ka din – Featuring as lead Female vocalist in the playback song "Raat Saturday ki hai Baat Saturday ki hai" with Mika Singh and Ajaz Khan.
 Holiday – Bride Role in Bollywood hit starring Sonakshi Sinha and Akshay Kumar.
 Between – Short film in UK Directed by Marcus Flemming alongside Nina Wadia.
 Bridal wear shoot –  Vasavi Fashion.
 Make up and hair print shoot for Bharat and Dorris.
 Calendar shoot with Vipin Goje.
 Jeans print shoot for Marx clothing.
 Jewellery print shoot – Bhima and Brother Jewellers.

Concerts and other activities 
She has been performing across the globe from UK and India to Japan, Hong Kong, around USA, Philippines, Egypt, Switzerland, Singapore, Africa, Thailand, Indonesia, Dubai, Malaysia and has also performed recently in Kuwait.
She along with Altaf Raja and Krupesh Thacker has judged the Finale of "Sur Gujarat ke" singing competition across Gujarat at Gandhidham.

References

1987 births
Living people
Gujarati people
Playback singers
Singers from London
Sa Re Ga Ma Pa participants
20th-century Indian singers
21st-century English singers
20th-century English singers
20th-century English women singers
21st-century Indian singers
21st-century English women singers